Sweden was the host nation for the 1912 Summer Olympics in Stockholm. 444 competitors, 421 men and 23 women, took part in 95 events in 16 sports.

Medalists

Athletics
106 or 107 athletes represented Sweden in the sport. Tage Brauer is listed in some sources as having competed and having cleared 1.60 metres in high jump, but other sources make clear he did not start.

Aside from the 107 athletes listed above Hugo Ahrén, Janne Andersson, Lennart Andrén, Tage Brauer, Carl Frick, Folke Hellstedt, Georg Holmqvist, John Johansson, Erik Larsson, Seth Levin, Josef Lindblom, Filip Löwendahl, Helmer Måhl, Anton Nilsson, Torwald Norling, David Nygren, Carl Silfverstrand, Erik Simonsson, Erik Svensson, Knut Thelning and Tor Österlund were also registered to participate in one or several athletic events, but did not do so.

Cycling

Road cycling

Diving

Equestrian

Fencing

Football

Summary

Round of 16

Gymnastics

Modern pentathlon

Rowing

Sailing

Shooting

Swimming

Tennis

Tug of war

Water polo

Summary

Quarterfinals

Semifinals

Repechage second round

Silver medal match

Wrestling

References

External links

Official Olympic Reports
International Olympic Committee results database

Nations at the 1912 Summer Olympics
1912
Olympics